Roy Hilton is a male retired boxer who competed for England.

Boxing career
Hilton was the National Champion in 1973 after winning the prestigious Amateur Boxing Association British flyweight title, boxing out of the Repton ABC.

He represented England in the flyweight (-51 Kg) division, at the 1974 British Commonwealth Games in Christchurch, New Zealand.

References

English male boxers
Boxers at the 1974 British Commonwealth Games
Lightweight boxers
Flyweight boxers
Commonwealth Games competitors for England